Puschendorf is a municipality in the district of Fürth in Bavaria in Germany.

References

Fürth (district)